Irvin Mayfield is the debut album by jazz trumpeter Irvin Mayfield as bandleader.

Track listing 
"The Great M.D." 9:03
"Right Here, Right Now" 5:59
"Body and Soul" 6:31  
"Immaculate Conception"  6:55  
"Midnight Theme" 9:06  
"You're My Everything" 5:40  
"Lascivious Intervention" 8:50  
"Giant Steps" 3:22  
"Ninth Ward Blues" 4:54

Personnel
Irvin Mayfield - trumpet, bandleader
Peter Martin, Victor Atkins III - piano
Ellis Marsalis (track 3) - piano
David Pulphus - double bass
Delfeayo Marsalis - trombone
Donald Harrison - alto saxophone
Jaz Sawyer, Reuben Rogers, Adonis Rose, Troy Davis - drums

1998 debut albums
Irvin Mayfield albums
Post-bop albums